Idrettsforeningen Fløya is a Norwegian football club from the city of Tromsø. The club was founded on 22 June 1922 and named after the Fløya mountain which overlooks Tromsø centre.

The women's team has got two third-place finishes in Toppserien, in 2004 and 2005, as its best ever achievements. On 16 December 2020, the women's team merged with Tromsø IL under the name of TIL 2020. The new name was taken into effect starting from the 2022 season.

The men's team plays in the Norwegian Third Division, the fourth tier in the Norwegian football league system. The famous Norwegian striker Rune Lange started his career in IF Fløya.

Recent seasons

Women's seasons
{|class="wikitable"
|-bgcolor="#efefef"
! Season
! 
! Pos.
! Pl.
! W
! D
! L
! GS
! GA
! P
!Cup
!Notes
|-
|2005
|Toppserien
|align=right bgcolor=cc9966|3
|align=right|18||align=right|10||align=right|3||align=right|5
|align=right|49||align=right|27||align=right|33
|Quarter-final
|
|-
|2006
|Toppserien
|align=right |7
|align=right|18||align=right|4||align=right|2||align=right|12
|align=right|24||align=right|57||align=right|14
||Semi-final
|
|-
|2007
|Toppserien
|align=right |9
|align=right|22||align=right|7||align=right|4||align=right|11
|align=right|36||align=right|52||align=right|25
||Quarter-final
|
|-
|2008
|Toppserien
|align=right |7
|align=right|22||align=right|9||align=right|3||align=right|10
|align=right|41||align=right|39||align=right|30
|Quarter-final
|
|-
|2009
|Toppserien
|align=right |8
|align=right|22||align=right|7||align=right|4||align=right|11
|align=right|36||align=right|37||align=right|25
|Quarter-final
|
|-
|2010
|Toppserien
|align=right bgcolor="#FFCCCC"| 12
|align=right|22||align=right|1||align=right|3||align=right|18
|align=right|15||align=right|66||align=right|6
|Quarter-final
|Relegated
|-
|2011
|1. divisjon
|align=right |3
|align=right|20||align=right|10||align=right|5||align=right|5
|align=right|43||align=right|26||align=right|35
|1st round
|
|-
|2012 
|1. divisjon
|align=right |6
|align=right|22||align=right|11||align=right|1||align=right|10
|align=right|44||align=right|37||align=right|34
|3rd round
|
|-
|2013 
|1. divisjon
|align=right |6
| align="right" |20|| align="right" |9||align=right|2|| align="right" |9
| align="right" |50|| align="right" |43||align=right|29
|3rd round
|
|-
|2014 
|1. divisjon
|align=right bgcolor="#FFCCCC"| 12
| align="right" |22|| align="right" |1||align=right|6|| align="right" |15
| align="right" |18|| align="right" |56||align=right|9
|2nd round
|Relegated
|-
|2015 
|2. divisjon
|align=right bgcolor=#DDFFDD| 1
| align="right" |14|| align="right" |12||align=right|1|| align="right" |1
| align="right" |61|| align="right" |7||align=right|37
|2nd round
|Promoted
|-
|2016 
|1. divisjon
|align=right |4
| align="right" |22|| align="right" |12||align=right|3|| align="right" |7
| align="right" |55|| align="right" |33||align=right|39
|3rd round
|
|-
|2017 
|1. divisjon
|align=right |7
| align="right" |22|| align="right" |8||align=right|4|| align="right" |10
| align="right" |37|| align="right" |36||align=right|28
|2nd round
|
|-
|2018 
|1. divisjon
|align=right |7
| align="right" |22|| align="right" |8||align=right|5|| align="right" |9
| align="right" |37|| align="right" |40||align=right|29
|3rd round
|
|-
|2019 
|1. divisjon
|align=right |1
| align="right" |22|| align="right" |15||align=right|2|| align="right" |5
| align="right" |62|| align="right" |30||align=right|47
|3rd round
|
|-
|2020 
|1. divisjon
|align=right |9
| align="right" |18|| align="right" |1||align=right|3|| align="right" |14
| align="right" |19|| align="right" |55||align=right|6
|1st round
|
|-
|2021
|1. divisjon
|align=right |5
| align="right" |18|| align="right" |7||align=right|3|| align="right" |8
| align="right" |31|| align="right" |27||align=right|24
|Quarter-final
|
|}

Men's seasons
{|class="wikitable"
|-bgcolor="#efefef"
! Season
! 
! Pos.
! Pl.
! W
! D
! L
! GS
! GA
! P
!Cup
!Notes
|-
|2011
|3. divisjon
|align=right |5
|align=right|22||align=right|11||align=right|2||align=right|9
|align=right|62||align=right|58||align=right|35
||First round
|
|-
|2012 
|3. divisjon
|align=right |2
|align=right|22||align=right|16||align=right|2||align=right|4
|align=right|103||align=right|28||align=right|50
||Second qual. round
|
|-
|2013
|3. divisjon
|align=right |2
|align=right|22||align=right|15||align=right|2||align=right|5
|align=right|68||align=right|30||align=right|47
||Second round 
|
|-
|2014
|3. divisjon
|align=right |2
|align=right|22||align=right|15||align=right|4||align=right|3
|align=right|63||align=right|23||align=right|49
||First round
|
|-
|2015
|3. divisjon
|align=right |3
|align=right|22||align=right|14||align=right|1||align=right|7
|align=right|59||align=right|32||align=right|43
||Second round
|
|-
|2016
|3. divisjon
|align=right| 1
|align=right|22||align=right|18||align=right|2||align=right|2
|align=right|82||align=right|23||align=right|56
||First round
|
|-
|2017
|3. divisjon
|align=right| 8
|align=right|26||align=right|9||align=right|8||align=right|9
|align=right|42||align=right|39||align=right|36
||Third round
|
|-
|2018
|3. divisjon
|align=right| 4
|align=right|26||align=right|14||align=right|5||align=right|7
|align=right|56||align=right|35||align=right|47
||First round
|
|-
|2019
|3. divisjon
|align=right bgcolor=#DDFFDD| 1
|align=right|26||align=right|18||align=right|2||align=right|6
|align=right|75||align=right|40||align=right|56
||Second round
|Promoted
|-
|2020
|2. divisjon
|align=right| 14
|align=right|13||align=right|0||align=right|1||align=right|12
|align=right|10||align=right|54||align=right|1
|Cancelled
|
|-
|2021
|2. divisjon
|align=right bgcolor="#FFCCCC"| 13
|align=right|26||align=right|2||align=right|8||align=right|16
|align=right|29||align=right|72||align=right|14
|Second round
|Relegated
|}

Honours
Men
Northern Norwegian Cup: 1936
Women
Toppserien bronze: 2004, 2005

References

External links
Official website

Football clubs in Norway
Association football clubs established in 1922
Sport in Tromsø
1922 establishments in Norway